The 1932 King's Birthday Honours in New Zealand, celebrating the official birthday of King George V, were appointments made by the King to various orders and honours to reward and highlight good works by New Zealanders. They were announced on 3 June 1932.

The recipients of honours are displayed here as they were styled before their new honour.

Knight Bachelor
 Albert Cecil Day  – official secretary to the governor-general since 1913.
 William Duffus Hunt – of Wellington. For public services.

Order of Saint Michael and Saint George

Companion (CMG)
 Professor James Hight  – rector of Canterbury University College, Christchurch.
 Alexander Dallas Park – secretary to the Treasury.

Order of the British Empire

Commander (CBE)
 George McNamara – secretary, Post and Telegraph Department.

References

Birthday Honours
1932 awards
1932 in New Zealand
New Zealand awards